The association football competition at the 2006 Central American and Caribbean Games was played from 16 July to 29 July 2006. Qualification took place beforehand.

Colombia won the competition, beating Venezuela 2-1 in the Gold medal match. The tournament was made up of U-21 players.

Medal summary

Preliminary round

Group A

Group B

Group C

Group D

Final round

Bracket

Quarterfinals

Semifinals

Third Place

Final

Statistics

Goalscorers

References

External links
https://web.archive.org/web/20060718060957/http://www.concacaf.com/viewCompetition.asp?id=159
2006 Central American and Caribbean Games at RSSSF

2006 Central American and Caribbean Games
2006
CEn
2006
Cen
Cent